Dahar may refer to:

Ahmed A-Dahar (1906–1984), Israeli Arab politician
Amine Dahar (born 1985), Algerian footballer
Dhahar District, a district of the Sanaag region of Somalia
Jebel Dahar, a mountain range of Tunisia
Kebri Dahar, a town in eastern Ethiopia 
Kabri Dar Airport, an international airport in Kebri Dahar 
Kebri Dahar (woreda), a woreda of eastern Ethiopia
Daher clan, or Dahar clan, from Sindh, Pakistan